Since 1901, the Nobel Prizes (Physics, Chemistry, Physiology or Medicine, Literature and Peace) and the Nobel Memorial Prize in Economic Sciences which began in 1969, have been awarded to 975 people and 27 organizations. In accordance to the Swedish inventor and industrialist Alfred Nobel's 1895 will the prizes should be awarded to "those who, during the preceding year, have conferred the greatest benefit to mankind."

Since the establishment of the prize, only one Korean has earned the prestige of becoming a Nobel laureate: South Korean President Kim Dae-jung for the 2000 Nobel Peace Prize for his efforts to push for national reconciliation between the divided Koreas during a summit meeting in Pyongyang. The American Charles J. Pedersen, who won the 1987 Nobel Prize in Chemistry, was born in Busan, South Korea to a Japanese mother and a Norwegian father.

Despite only having one Nobel laureate, numerous North and South Korean individuals (both citizens within the country and living in diasporic communities) and organizations have been nominated for the prize in any category. While Japan had already its 23rd Nobel laureate in science in 2018, Korea still has failed to produce any laureate. It was speculated that poor basic science education in school and universities was behind this failure and that immediate upgrading in scientific studies are needed. South Korean President Yoon Suk-yeol voiced optimism over the future of the field of science in Korea, saying "Korea will have Nobel laureates soon."

Laureates

Nominations
The first Korean to earn a nomination for the Nobel Prize was the poet Yi Gwangsu. Unfortunately he died in 1950, therefore his nomination was done posthumously and, according to the Nobel statutes, posthumous nominations are automatically disqualified during the committee's deliberations. Only living individuals and existing organizations are permitted to be nominated. Since then, other Koreans began getting nominated for the prestigious Swedish prize in different categories. The following list are the nominees with verified nominations from the Nobel Committee and recognized international organizations. There are also other purported nominees whose nominations are yet to be verified since the archives are revealed 50 years after, among them:
 For Physics: Benjamin W. Lee (1935–1977), Moo-Young Han (1934–2016), Ihm Jisoon (born 1954), Noh Tae-won (born 1957) and Philip Kim (born 1967).
 For Chemistry: Yoon Nung-min (1927–2009), Kim Kimoon (born 1954), Ryoo Ryong (born 1955), Nam-Gyu Park (born 1960), Hyeon Taeghwan (born 1964) and YoungSoo Kim (born 1978).
 For Physiology or Medicine: Ho Wang Lee (1928–2022), Yu Myeong-Hee (born 1954), V. Narry Kim (born 1969) and Charles Lee (born 1969).
 For Literature: Kim Dongni (1913–1995), Hwang Sun-won (1915–2000), Seo Jeong-ju (1915–2000), Ku Sang (1919–2004), Pak Kyongni (1926–2008), Park Wan-suh (1931–2011), Choe Inhun (1936–2018), Ko Un (born 1933), Claudia Lee Hae-in (born 1933), Hwang Sok-yong (born 1943), Yi Munyeol (born 1948), Kim Hyesoon (born 1955), Yi Seungu (born 1959), Shin Kyung-sook (born 1963), Kim Young-ha (born 1968) and Han Kang (born 1970).
 For Peace: Chang Chun-ha (1918–1975), Kim Yong-ki (1908–1988), Chang Kee-ryo (1911–1995), Lee Tai-young (1914–1998), Lee Jong-wook (1945–2006), Park Won-soon (1955–2020), Han Seung-soo (born 1936), Ban Ki-moon (born 1944), John Woong-Jin Oh (born 1944), Kim Jong-ki (born 1947), Moon Jae-in (born 1953), Pomnyun Sunim (born 1953), Kitack Lim (born 1956), Kim Jung-un (born 1984) and Yeonmi Park (born 1993)
 For Economics: Hyun-Song Shin (born 1959) and Ha-Joon Chang (born 1963).

Nominees

Nominators
The following Korean individuals became qualified nominators of local and foreign contenders for the Nobel Prize in any category:

Notes

References

Lists of Nobel laureates by nationality
South Korean Nobel laureates
Lists of Korean people